Cobalt(II) phosphide is an inorganic compound with the chemical formula Co3P2.

References

Cobalt(II) compounds
Phosphides